Michael Daniel Higgins (born 18 April 1941) is an Irish politician, poet, sociologist, and broadcaster, who has served as the ninth president of Ireland since November 2011. Entering national politics through the Labour Party, he served as a senator from 1973 to 1977 having been nominated by the Taoiseach. Elected in 1981 as a Teachta Dála (TD), he represented the Galway West constituency from 1981 to 1982 and 1987 to 2011. Between these terms, he returned to Seanad Éireann from 1983 to 1987 as a senator for the National University. He served as Minister for Arts, Culture and the Gaeltacht from 1993 to 1997 and mayor of Galway from 1981 to 1982 and 1990 to 1991. Higgins was the president of the Labour Party from 2003 to 2011, until he resigned following his election as president of Ireland.

Higgins has used his time in office as president to address issues concerning justice, social equality, social inclusion, anti-sectarianism, anti-racism, and reconciliation. He made the first state visit by an Irish president to the United Kingdom in April 2014.
 
Higgins ran for a second term as president of Ireland in 2018 and was re-elected in a landslide victory. Higgins attained the largest personal mandate in the history of the Republic of Ireland, with 822,566 first-preference votes. Higgins' second presidential inauguration took place on 11 November 2018.

Early life
Higgins was born on 18 April 1941 in Limerick. His father, John Higgins, was from Ballycar, County Clare, and was a lieutenant with the Charleville Company, 3rd Battalion, 2nd Cork Brigade of the Irish Republican Army. John, along with his two brothers Peter and Michael, had been active participants in the Irish War of Independence.

When John's father's health grew poor, with alcohol abuse as a contributing factor, John sent Michael, aged five, and his four-year-old brother to live on his unmarried uncle and aunt's farm near Newmarket-on-Fergus, County Clare. His elder twin sisters remained in Limerick. He was educated at Ballycar National School, County Clare and St. Flannan's College, Ennis.

As an undergraduate at University College Galway (UCG), he served as vice-auditor of the college's Literary and Debating Society in 1963–64, and rose to the position of auditor in the 1964–65 academic year. He also served as president of UCG Students' Union in 1964–65. In 1967, Higgins graduated from the American Indiana University Bloomington with a Master of Arts degree in Sociology. He also briefly attended the University of Manchester.

In his academic career, he was a statutory lecturer in the Department of Political Science and Sociology at UCG and was a visiting professor at Southern Illinois University. He resigned his academic posts to concentrate fully on his political career.

He is a fluent Irish language speaker and also speaks Spanish.

Family life
His wife, Sabina Higgins (née Coyne), is an actress and a native of Cloonrane, a townland in County Galway near Ballindine, County Mayo. She grew up on a farm there in a family of five girls and two boys.

Higgins met Coyne in 1969, at a party in the family home of journalist Mary Kenny in Dublin. Higgins proposed over Christmas 1973, and they were married the year after. They have four children: Alice Mary, Daniel, and twins, John and Michael Jr.; Alice Mary was elected to Seanad Éireann in 2016.

Political career (1973–2011)

Seanad and Dáil Éireann
Higgins originally joined Fianna Fáil in UCG while a mature student and was elected its branch chairman in 1966; he switched to the Labour Party shortly thereafter. He was a Labour candidate in the 1969 and 1973 general elections but was unsuccessful on both occasions. One of the people who canvassed for him was future leader of the Labour Party and Tánaiste, Eamon Gilmore, who was then a UCG student. Higgins was appointed in 1973 to the 13th Seanad Éireann by Taoiseach Liam Cosgrave. He was first elected to Dáil Éireann at the 1981 general election as a Labour Party TD. He was re-elected at the February 1982 election; he lost his seat at the November 1982 election (blaming his loss in part on his opposition to the Eighth Amendment), but returned to the Seanad when he was elected by the National University constituency. He served as Mayor of Galway on two occasions, 1982–1983 and 1991–1992. Within the Labour Party during the 1980s he was one of the main figures, along with Emmet Stagg, who opposed going into coalition.

Higgins returned to the Dáil at the 1987 general election and held his seat until the 2011 general election. In 1993, he joined the Cabinet as Minister for Arts, Culture and the Gaeltacht. During his period as minister he scrapped the controversial Section 31 of the Broadcasting Act, re-established the Irish Film Board and set up the Irish language television station, Teilifís na Gaeilge (later renamed TG4). He was appointed to the Labour Party front bench in 2000. In 2003, Higgins succeeded Proinsias De Rossa in the symbolic position of the President of the Labour Party, while continuing as the party's spokesman on foreign affairs.

Higgins indicated his interest in contesting the 2004 presidential election for the Labour Party. The party decided on 16 September 2004 against running a candidate in the election, seeing Mary McAleese as unbeatable.

In October 2010, he announced he would not be standing at the 2011 general election. He had until this point been living in a modest two-bed apartment at Grattan Hall on Mount Street, Dublin. He also has a family home in Galway.

2011 presidential campaign

In September 2010, Higgins indicated that he was interested in receiving the Labour Party's nomination for the 2011 presidential election. He said prior to the election campaign, and repeated during it, that he would serve only one seven-year term as president, and would not seek a second term of office, despite being entitled to do so.

He was selected as a candidate for the presidency at a special convention in Dublin on 19 June 2011, beating former senator Kathleen O'Meara and former party adviser Fergus Finlay. His candidacy was endorsed by Hollywood actor Martin Sheen, who described Higgins as a "dear friend". Higgins assisted his rival David Norris by urging his party colleagues on Dublin City Council not to obstruct Norris's attempts to get onto the ballot at the last moment "in the interests of democracy", adding that the nomination criteria were "outdated".

Higgins was confronted by former Tara mines workers while canvassing in Meath. The workers were upset about their pensions being cut. Higgins was also pursued by his past links to the Fianna Fáil party, and admitted on 13 October that he had been elected chairman of the UCG Fianna Fáil university cumann in 1966. He admitted that he had smoked marijuana while at university in the United States. However, media reports said he was "spared the intense grilling Miriam O'Callaghan meted out to some of the others" during the Prime Time debate. Higgins promised he would be a neutral president if elected and not be a "handmaiden" to the government. The Labour Party's budget for the campaign was within €320,000.

On 29 October 2011, two days after the presidential election was held, Higgins was declared the winner with a total of 1,007,104 votes, far more than any Irish politician in the history of the republic. Thousands of people lined the streets of Galway to welcome him home the following day. International media coverage of his win reported his humble background, poetry and intellect, with The Washington Post noting "local satirists sometimes depict him as an elf, hobbit or leprechaun talking in riddles and verse". He is the first president of Ireland to have served in both Houses of the Oireachtas, having previously been a member of Dáil Éireann (Lower House) and Seanad Éireann (Upper House).

Before his inauguration, Higgins and his family met his predecessor Mary McAleese and her husband Martin for lunch at Áras an Uachtaráin on 3 November. That night, he presented an award to Niall Tóibín, and received his own standing ovation as he entered the Irish Film Institute. On 5 November, he attended an important football game, featuring Galway United versus Monaghan United in the second leg in the League of Ireland promotion/relegation play-off at Terryland Park, wrapped in the scarf of his favourite team, and being greeted by a large banner hanging from a stand declaring "Welcome home to Galway, Mr President".

Presidency

First term (2011–2018)
 
Higgins was inaugurated as president of Ireland at Dublin Castle on 11 November 2011. The ceremony had a humanist element, alongside Christian, Jewish and Muslim ones. He receives an annual salary of €250,000, having requested during his first term that the Department of Public Expenditure and Reform reduce his salary by 23.5% from €325,000.

Higgins travelled to Derry to attend the final of the All-Ireland school choir of the year competition on 13 November 2011, for his first official presidential engagement in Northern Ireland. In December 2011, he hosted a children's tea party at Áras an Uachtaráin. He attended the Bon Secours Hospital in Galway on 13 December for surgery on the kneecap that was broken in a fall during a visit to Buenaventura, Colombia in 2010.

Higgins made his first official trip abroad when he went to London on 21 February 2012. While there he was given a tour of the Olympic Stadium by Sebastian Coe, and attended a production of Juno and the Paycock at the Lyttelton Theatre. He made his first official visit to his alma mater NUI Galway on 24 February, where he opened an autism centre. On 21 March 2012, Higgins was announced as sole patron of the RTÉ National Symphony Orchestra. Addressing a conference organised by youth organisation Foróige on 24 March 2012, Higgins described homophobia and racism in Ireland as a "blight on society".

In January 2012, Higgins agreed to become the patron of Clans of Ireland, including its Order of Merit. On the president's behalf, Minister for Transport, Tourism and Sport Leo Varadkar, awarded "Companionship" in this Order of Clans of Ireland to several nominees at a ceremony in the Mansion House, Dublin on 28 April 2012. On 11 May 2012, he became the 28th Freeman of Galway. In June 2012, nonprofit housing organisation Habitat for Humanity Ireland announced that Higgins would be their sole Patron. In October 2012, Higgins and his wife Sabina went to South America for a two-week trip, visiting Argentina, Brazil and Chile. Higgins rushed home from a visit to Rome, Italy, to sign the Irish Bank Resolution Corporation Bill 2013 into law at Áras an Uachtaráin early on 7 February 2013, on the urgent request of the Government of Ireland. On 29 July 2013, he convened a meeting of the Council of State, the first of his presidency, to consult on the Protection of Life During Pregnancy Bill 2013.

Special advisor to the president, Mary van Lieshout, who formed part of the management team in Áras an Uachtaráin under Secretary General Adrian O'Neill, resigned in November 2013. The departure raised criticism over presidential management of the team. The presidential Christmas messages delivered by Higgins from 2011 to 2013 did not mention Christianity or religion, which was criticised by the Defence Forces' chaplain in a homily on Christmas Eve 2013. The Chief of Staff expressed regret for any offence caused by the chaplain.

In April 2014, Higgins paid the first state visit to the United Kingdom by an Irish president. He stayed as a guest of Queen Elizabeth II at Windsor Castle and addressed both Houses of Parliament. He also met various people, including the British prime minister, David Cameron, and opposition party leaders at Westminster, and the lord mayor of London, Alan Yarrow. In December 2014, Higgins made a week-long state visit to China.

In November 2016, Higgins received criticism from some sections of the Irish media for praising Fidel Castro, saying in a statement that he learned of Castro's death with "great sadness".

On 25 August 2018, Higgins received Pope Francis at Áras an Uachtaráin during the Pope's visit to Ireland.

Second term (2018–present)
On 10 July 2018, Higgins announced that he would stand for a second term as president in the 2018 Irish presidential election. Higgins won the 2018 presidential election with 56% of the vote on the first count (822,566). His nearest rival, Peter Casey, finished on 23% (342,727).
On 11 November 2018, Higgins was inaugurated as president of Ireland in St. Patrick's Hall, Dublin Castle, in a ceremony attended by Taoiseach Leo Varadkar, and former presidents Mary Robinson  and Mary McAleese, as well as representatives of all political parties. The ceremony was held in the evening, so that Higgins could attend Armistice Day commemorations in the morning.

On 3 July 2019, Higgins began a three-day state visit to Germany. While visiting Germany, Higgins met with German chancellor Angela Merkel and President of Germany Frank-Walter Steinmeier.

In July 2021, Higgins sent a letter to the Oireachtas expressing concern that there had been a tendency in recent years for him to be sent a large volume of complex legislation to be signed in a short period.

On 15 September 2021, Higgins declined an invitation to attend a church service with Britain's Queen Elizabeth in October to mark Northern Ireland's centenary. Two days later on 17 September, Higgins defended his decision not to attend the service and decided it would be "inappropriate to attend". Pope Francis described Higgins as a "wise man of today" during an audience in the Vatican.

On 15 June 2022, Higgins described housing in Ireland as "our great, great failure", saying "It isn't a crisis anymore - it is a disaster."

On 19 September 2022, Higgins was among 500 presidents, prime ministers, foreign royal family members and dignitaries who attended the state funeral of Queen Elizabeth II.

On 24 January 2023, Higgins began a five-day state visit to Senegal, his first time in Africa since 2014. While visiting Senegal, Higgins met with Senegalese president Macky Sall.

Council of State

Presidential appointees
Higgins appointed his Council of State nominees on 6 January 2012 for this first term as president. The nominees were:
Michael Farrell – solicitor with Free Legal Advice Centres
Deirdre Heenan – Provost and Dean of Academic Development at the University of Ulster
Catherine McGuinness – former Senator, member of the Council of State, and former Supreme Court judge
Ruairí McKiernan – community activist and social entrepreneur
Sally Mulready – London-resident campaigner for the rights of survivors of Irish institutions and local councillor in the London Borough of Hackney
Gearóid Ó Tuathaigh – Professor emeritus in history at the National University of Ireland, Galway.
Gerard Quinn – Director of the Centre for Disability Law and Policy at the NUI Galway School of Law

Higgins' nominees for his second term of office are:
 Cara Augustenborg – a fellow in environmental policy at University College Dublin
 Sinéad Burke – writer, academic and disability activist
 Sindy Joyce – Irish Traveller human rights activist
 Maurice Malone – chief executive of the Birmingham Irish Association.
 Johnston McMaster – a Methodist minister and assistant professor at Trinity College Dublin
 Mary Murphy – senior lecturer at Maynooth University
 Seán Ó Cuirreáin – former radio producer and Irish language commissioner

Writing

As well as having a successful political career Higgins has had a career as a poet and broadcaster and has produced works of non-fiction. He has contributed widely to political and philosophical journals on numerous subjects, among them ideology, the sociology of literature, clientelism in politics, regionalism and the politics of the media. He wrote and presented a television film on Montserrat, entitled The Other Emerald Isle for Channel 4 and his documentary on the life of Noel Browne, for RTÉ, has also been screened.

Higgins has had poems published in a number of periodicals, as well as publishing four collections of his poetry, including The Betrayal (1990), his second book of poems The Season of Fire (1993) and his latest book An Arid Season (2004). His personal notes and work books reside at the National Library of Ireland.

On 27 October 2016, Higgins visited Linen Hall Library. Being a poet himself, he was particularly interested in resources pertaining to local poet Sir Samuel Ferguson.

Among Higgins' poems are "The death of the Red Cow" and "The Ass", an ode to a donkey.

Poetry
 The Betrayal (Salmon, Galway, 1990) 
 The Season of Fire (Brandon, Dingle, 1993) 
 An Arid Season (2004)
 New and Selected Poems (Liberties Press, Dublin, 2011)
 The Prophets are Weeping (M.D.H. 2014) 
Non-fiction
 Causes for Concern (Liberties Press, Dublin, 2007)
 Renewing the Republic (Liberties Press, Dublin, 2011)
 Foreword to "Delinquent Genius: The Strange Affair of Man and His Technology" by Mike Cooley

Other work

Higgins has campaigned for human rights and written of conflict in many parts of the world, including such areas as Nicaragua, Chile, Cambodia, El Salvador, Iraq and Somalia. He spoke in the Dáil in defence of the 2010 Gaza Freedom Flotilla. In recognition of his work for peace with justice in many parts of the world, he became the first recipient of the Seán MacBride Peace Prize of the International Peace Bureau in Helsinki in 1992. He was a noted critic of U.S. foreign policy under the Ronald Reagan administration. In 2005, in response to a column for the Irish Independent by Kevin Myers about the riots then erupting across immigrant areas in France and Britain, he said "the contents of his column today go beyond his usually crafted cowardice, staying one step on the safe side of prosecution for incitement to hatred or racism."

Higgins has voiced his support for the Campaign for the Establishment of a United Nations Parliamentary Assembly, an organisation which campaigns for democratic reformation of the United Nations, and the creation of a more accountable international political system.

Higgins's eclectic mix of interests also extends to sport; he is a regular at the Galway Races each summer. He has also previously served as president of Galway United F.C., is a well known football supporter and regularly attends League of Ireland games. In 2014 the Football Association of Ireland introduced a new association football super cup, the President's Cup, in his honour. On 25 February 2014, the cup itself was officially unveiled with a ceremony at Áras an Uachtaráin. Higgins subsequently attended the inaugural final at Richmond Park on 2 March 2014.

He is the subject of the song "Michael D. Rocking in the Dáil" by popular Tuam band The Saw Doctors. The song first appeared as a B-side on the 1994 single "Small Bit of Love" and is also on the 2002 compilation Play It Again, Sham!.

Honours and awards

Foreign honours
 El Salvador: Grand Cross of the Order of José Matías Delgado. Awarded in 2013 after Higgins returned to El Salvador as president of Ireland, where 31 years earlier he had visited on a fact-finding mission to investigate the El Mozote massacre.
 Peru: Grand Collar of the Order of the Sun of Peru. Awarded in 2017.

References

External links

Biography at Áras an Uachtaráin website

, TG4,  2011.
 (RTÉ video in Irish and English)  
Presidential inauguration speech (Text)
Audio recording of speech opening the G. B. Shaw: Back in Town conference, Dublin 2012
Henry, William (2002). Role of Honour: The Mayors of Galway City 1485–2001. Galway: Galway City Council.  

|-

|-

|-

|-

|-

|-

|-

 
1941 births
Living people
Alumni of the University of Galway
Alumni of the University of Manchester
Candidates for President of Ireland
Michael D.
Hot Press people
Indiana University Bloomington alumni
Irish-language writers
Irish lecturers
Irish poets
Labour Party (Ireland) senators
Labour Party (Ireland) TDs
Mayors of Galway
Local councillors in Galway (city)
Members of Seanad Éireann for the National University of Ireland
Members of the 13th Seanad
Members of the 17th Seanad
Members of the 22nd Dáil
Members of the 23rd Dáil
Members of the 25th Dáil
Members of the 26th Dáil
Members of the 27th Dáil
Members of the 28th Dáil
Members of the 29th Dáil
Members of the 30th Dáil
Nominated members of Seanad Éireann
People educated at St Flannan's College
Politicians from County Galway
Politicians from County Limerick
Presidents of Ireland
TG4 people